Donny Tuimaseve (born 17 April 1999) is a Samoan athlete. He competed in the 2018 Commonwealth Games on the Gold Coast in Australia, as well as in the 2022 Pacific Mini Games.

Tuimaseve was born in Vaiafai on the island of Savaiʻi.

He competed in the 2017 Pacific Mini Games, winning a gold medal with a throw of 63.73m. At the Gold Coast Commonwealth Games in 2018 he came 10th in his qualifying round, with a throw of 67.78m. Following the competition he took a three year break from the sport to work as a Mormon missionary in the Philippines.

At the 2022 Pacific Mini Games in Saipan he won gold in the javelin with a throw of 69.05m.

References

Living people
1999 births
People from Fa'asaleleaga
Samoan male javelin throwers
Athletes (track and field) at the 2018 Commonwealth Games
Commonwealth Games competitors for Guyana
21st-century Samoan people